Propionicimonas paludicola is a  Gram-positive, non-spore-forming, pleomorphic and non-motile bacterium from the genus Propionicimonas which has been isolated from plant residue from rice field soil in Japan.

References 

Propionibacteriales
Bacteria described in 2003